Foley Gallery is a contemporary art gallery in Manhattan, New York City, owned by Michael Foley. Since opening in 2004, Foley Gallery has moved from the Chelsea neighborhood to the Lower East Side in 2014. Among the artists Foley represents are Joseph Desler Costa, Wyatt Gallery, Sage Sohier, Martin Klimas, Simon Schubert, Henry Leutwyler and Ina Jang. Foley has previously shown work by Rosalind Solomon, Polixeni Papapetrou, Rachell Sumpter and Hank Willis Thomas.

Background 
Michael Foley opened Foley Gallery in 2004. Years prior, Foley began art dealing by invitation of Frish Brandt, the former director, (now president) of Fraenkel Gallery. While under Brandt's direction, Foley became friendly with photographers Richard Misrach, Adam Fuss, and Hiroshi Sugimoto. Foley Gallery exhibited art from represented artist Simon Schubert during Volta Art Fair in 2015 and 2018. Sherri Littlefield joined Foley Gallery as Director in 2016.

Book launches 

In November 2016, Document, by Henry Leutwyler published by Steidl was released at Foley Gallery. Other book launches have included Jewish Treasures of the Caribbean, by Wyatt Gallery and Circadian Landscape by Jessica Antola.

References 

Contemporary art galleries in the United States
Art museums and galleries in Manhattan
Art galleries established in 2004
Lower East Side